Serge Schmemann (born April 12, 1945) is a writer and member of the editorial board of The New York Times who specializes in international affairs. He was editorial page editor of the Paris-based International Herald Tribune, the erstwhile global edition of The New York Times, from 2003 until its dissolution in 2013. Earlier in his career, he worked for the Associated Press and was a bureau chief and editor for The New York Times.

Life and career
Born in France, the son of Alexander Schmemann and Juliana Ossorguine (a descendant of Juliana of Lazarevo, a Russian Orthodox Saint), he moved to the United States in 1951. He grew up speaking Russian at home, but visited his ancestral homeland for the first time only in 1980 when he arrived with his family as Moscow correspondent for the Associated Press. It was not until 1990 that the Soviet authorities allowed him to visit his grandparents' home village near Kaluga. His reflections on the village's changing fate provided the subject matter for his memoirs, published in 1997.

A 1963 graduate of the Collegiate School on the Upper West Side of New York City, he received his undergraduate degree in English from Harvard University in 1967 and an M.A. in Slavic studies from Columbia University in 1971.

Writing for The New York Times, he won the Pulitzer Prize for International Reporting in 1991 for his coverage of the German reunification, which he also made the subject of a book. The September 12, 2001, New York Times featured a front-page article by Schmemann about the September 11 attacks. He won an Emmy Award (Outstanding Individual Achievement in a Craft: Writing) in 2003 for the Discovery Channel documentary Mortal Enemies.

Schmemann has three children and lives in the District of Columbia.

Awards 
1991 Pulitzer Prize for International Reporting for coverage of the reunification of Germany
1998 PEN/Martha Albrand Award for First Nonfiction for Echoes of a Native Land

Bibliography

References

Pulitzer Prize for International Reporting winners
1945 births
American male journalists
American people of Russian descent
Living people
International Herald Tribune people
Kent School alumni
The New York Times corporate staff
Collegiate School (New York) alumni
French emigrants to the United States
The New York Times editorial board
Harvard College alumni
Columbia University alumni